Christopher Lee Cobbins, (born August 30, 1984), who goes by the stage name Chris Cobbins, is an American Christian hip hop musician and Christian R&B artist from Kansas City, Missouri.  His debut album, Hello World, released on October 8, 2013 by Latebloom Records. This album was his Billboard chart debut album.

Early life
Cobbins was born on August 30, 1984, as Christopher Lee Cobbins, in Kansas City, Missouri. His father, Otis L. Cobbins Jr, is the pastor of Bread of Life East Church, and his mother is Christine Cobbins. He has two brothers, Ryan and Matthew Cobbins, and he has a sister, O'lea Cobbins.

Music career
His first studio album, Hello World, was released on October 8, 2013, with Latebloom Records. This was his debut album on the Billboard charts, and it happened to land a placement on Top Gospel Albums at No. 33. This will be his only album with the label, as he created his own imprint, Ryan's Brother Creations, which is to honor the death of his younger brother Ryan Terrell Cobbins.

Personal life
Cobbins is married to TraShana Cobbins (Miller), and together they are presently residing in Kansas City, Missouri. Cobbins became a father with the birth of his son, Drew Otis Christopher Cobbins born October 29, 2014. Attended Raytown Senior High School. He is the cousin of former Notre Dame linebacker Lyron Cobbins and Trenyce.

Discography

Studio albums

References

1984 births
Living people
African-American rappers
African-American Christians
Musicians from Kansas City, Missouri
American performers of Christian hip hop music
Rappers from Kansas City, Missouri
21st-century American rappers
21st-century African-American musicians
20th-century African-American people